Koruthodu  is a village/town in Kanjirappally Taluk, Kottayam District of Kerala state, India. It is situated on the Highway connecting Mundakayam to Sabarimala temple, Kerala, and is at the border of Pathanamthitta, Kottayam and Idukki districts. The nearest town Mundakayam is 13 Kilometers from Koruthodu. The river Azhutha (Tributary of Pamba) runs through the borders of this village. Nearby locations include Kanamala, Vandanpathal, Mundakkayam and Panakkachira.

Access
 Bangalore - Salem -Dindigul -Theni -Kumily -Mundakayam- Koruthodu
 Chennai -Trichy -Dindigul -Theni -Kumily -Mundakayam- Koruthodu
 Angamaly/Airport - Muvattupuzha -Thodupuzha-Erattupetta-Mundakayam- Koruthodu
 Thiruvananthapuram - Kottarakkara - Adoor -Pathanamthitta -Erumeli -Mundakayam- Koruthodu
 Kottayam - Ponkunnam - Kanjirappally -Mundakayam - Koruthodu
 Kochi/Cochin -Thalayolapparambu -Pala - Ponkunnam - Kanjirappally -Mundakayam - Koruthodu
 Sabarimala - Pampa - Kanamala  - Koruthodu 

Koruthodu is exactly 13 km South-East of Mundakayam Town. The State Highway connecting Mundakayam and Sabarimala passes through Koruthodu. Major cultivations are coffee, Tapioca, Banana, pepper, cocoa and natural rubber.

Sports and Games
Koruthodu can boast legacy in Indian athletic history as Koruthodu C.K.M. School was National champions in athletics for 15 years under the guidance of Dhronacharya 'K.P.Thomas'. Notable Olympians like  Anju Bobby George , Shiny Wilson , Joseph Abraham were found and nurtured here.

Nearest Airport
Cochin International Airport

See also
 National Highway 183 (India).
 Kanjirappally.

References

Villages in Kottayam district